Georgy Fyodorov (born 1926) was a Soviet athlete. He competed in the men's shot put at the 1952 Summer Olympics.

References

External links
  

1926 births
Possibly living people
Athletes (track and field) at the 1952 Summer Olympics
Soviet male shot putters
Olympic athletes of the Soviet Union
Place of birth missing